Elizabeth Finch  may refer to:

Elizabeth Younger (1699–1762), married name Elizabeth Finch, actress
Elizabeth Finch, 1st Countess of Winchilsea (1556–1634), English peeress
Elizabeth Finch (novel), by Julian Barnes, published in 2022

See also
Elisabeth R. Finch, American TV writer